Doimukh Legislative Assembly constituency is one of the 60 Legislative Assembly constituencies of Arunachal Pradesh state in India.

It is part of Papum Pare district and is reserved for candidates belonging to the Scheduled Tribes.

Members of the Legislative Assembly

Election results

2019

See also
 List of constituencies of the Arunachal Pradesh Legislative Assembly
 Papum Pare district

References

Papum Pare district
Assembly constituencies of Arunachal Pradesh